Bartholomew Henry "Barry" Allen, also known as The Flash, is a fictional character in the DC Extended Universe. Based on the DC Comics superhero of the same name, he is portrayed by American actor Ezra Miller. Originally appearing in a minor role in Batman v Superman: Dawn of Justice, Allen had a prominent role in the film Justice League and its director's cut. Miller has also reprised the role in other DC Comics media such as the Arrowverse and a cameo in the HBO Max series Peacemaker and is currently slated to star in The Flash, an upcoming film based on the character. The DC Extended Universe marks the first time The Flash has been portrayed in live-action film.

Development and portrayal

Early film proposals and casting for the DCEU
Development on a film based on The Flash started in the late 1980s when Warner Bros. hired comic book writer Jeph Loeb to write a screenplay, but nothing materialized from that. The project went dormant until it was brought up again following the release of Batman Begins, when writer David S. Goyer was offered a chance to write a script for either Flash or Green Lantern. In December 2004, Goyer was brought to write, produce and direct The Flash. He approached his Blade: Trinity co-star Ryan Reynolds for the Barry Allen role, with the intention of also using Wally West as a supporting character. Goyer soon dropped out due to creative differences, but a film based on the Justice League featuring Barry Allen soon entered development afterwards, with Shawn Levy set to direct and Adam Brody cast as Barry Allen. However, this film also fell through.

On June 9, 2010, Green Lantern writers Greg Berlanti (who would later create the 2014 TV series based on the Flash), Michael Green and Marc Guggenheim were hired to pen a treatment of the Flash film. The Flash script was to be based on the recent run by DC's Chief Creative Officer Geoff Johns. Mazeau told Blastr.com that the studio was still actively developing the big screen take on the DC Comics' character and that the project was still active. On July 20, 2013, The Hollywood Reporter has reported that the film was rumored to be released in 2016 but it has not been announced. In October 2014, Warner Bros. announced The Flash would be released in 2018 as the sixth installment of the DC Extended Universe. Ezra Miller was cast to play the title role of Barry Allen. The Flash was later postponed to 2022, with Miller providing assistance to re-writing the script following creative differences with original directors/screenwriters John Francis Daley and Jonathan Goldstein. It was later revealed in July 2019, that Andy Muschietti would officially be directing the film, with Christina Hodson serving as the screenwriter. In June 2020, TheWrap reported that Michael Keaton was in early talks to reprise his role of Bruce Wayne / Batman from Tim Burton's Batman (1989) and Batman Returns (1992). In August 2020, it officially confirmed that Keaton had signed on and that Ben Affleck would be reprising his role of Bruce Wayne / Batman from the DC Extended Universe. Filming began on April 19, 2021, at Warner Bros. Studios, Leavesden in Hertfordshire, England.

Once Zack Snyder received approval from WarnerMedia to film additional footage for his director's cut of Justice League in 2020, Miller, who at the time was taking part of filming for Fantastic Beasts: The Secrets of Dumbledore (2022) in London, was able to film their scenes as Barry Allen / Flash remotely, as Snyder directed the additional scene with Miller over Zoom. Snyder's video feed played through a stand on a table enabling him to direct Miller and the crew, who filmed the scene on his behalf.

Characterization

As portrayed in the films, Barry Allen is a remarkably intelligent and determined individual, studying to be a forensic scientist to prove the innocence of his imprisoned father Henry Allen in the death of his mother Nora Allen. As the Flash, Barry is determined to keep his secret identity a secret from others, demonstrated by the many excuses he came up with when confronted by Bruce Wayne, despite none of them being convincing enough to fool the latter. When finally exposed by Bruce, Barry is quick to agree to join the Justice League, due to his great desire to gain friends he could relate to. He deals with insecurity and a tragic past much like the other superheroes in the DCEU, but retains a humorous, talkative personality and positive attitude. Ezra Miller has described his portrayal of the character as "an exploration of a multi-dimensional human being" while exploring the character's consideration as a superhero and a person to "feel the humanity of someone who is heroic — or the heroism of someone who is a flawed, deeply human person." In addition, Barry is implied to be a fan of Rick and Morty and has an extremely fast metabolism due to his superhero activities.

Barry casually describes himself as an "attractive Jewish boy" when first meeting Bruce Wayne in Justice League, just as Ezra Miller is Jewish in real life. This makes the DCEU Flash the first version of the character to be Jewish, and the first confirmed Jewish superhero to appear in film. Prior to this, Ian McKellen/Michael Fassbender's Magneto, as portrayed in the X-Men film series, is shown to be Jewish, but is more often than not depicted as a supervillain.

Running style

Critics and fans have noticed Barry Allen's unorthodox running motion in both versions of Justice League. In an interview before the release of the theatrical cut, Ezra Miller shared that he had practiced martial arts for two years in preparation for the role, even venturing to the Wudang Mountains in China to study Qinggong. The monks he encountered inspired some of Barry's more meditative movements as well as his running motion while entering the Speed Force to reverse time during the climax of the "Snyder Cut". Miller also looked to the mechanics of speed skaters, dancers and choreographers as well as certain animals, stating "I was also inspired by crows, cheetahs, mongooses and other fast-moving and intelligent creatures, as well as by rushing water and, of course, lightning."

Fictional character biography

Origins 

Barry Allen was born in 1992. At one point in his life, he gains superhuman speed after a S.T.A.R. Labs incident, becoming a metahuman. During Allen’s early days as a superhero, he apprehends Captain Boomerang. Around 2015,  security footage of Allen apprehending a burglar with his superpowers is decrypted and examined by Wayne after being stolen from Lex Luthor's servers. Wayne sends the footage to Diana Prince.

In 2017, Allen meets Iris West, saving her from injury during a car crash while he also interviews for a job. He later visits his father Henry, who is imprisoned after being wrongly accused of murdering his wife and Allen's mother, Nora. Henry encourages Barry to "move on with his life" during this particular visit despite Barry's protests.

Stopping Steppenwolf

Theatrical cut

Wayne recruits Allen to join a team of metahumans in the wake of Clark Kent / Superman's death, which Allen enthusiastically accepts upon learning that Wayne is Batman. Allen ventures with Wayne to meet with Prince in Gotham City, where they also encounter police commissioner James Gordon and fellow metahuman Victor Stone, also known as "Cyborg".

As the team prepares to fight Steppenwolf and his parademon minions under Delaware Bay to retrieve a Mother Box, Allen is intimidated upon seeing a parademon slaughter one of the scientists guarding the relic, stating that he has "no combat skills". Wayne tells him to focus on saving one person, in order to boost his confidence, after which he manages to save Stone's father Silas and many other civilians, in addition to aiding Prince by retrieving her sword and protecting her from a falling column. The team is aided by Arthur Curry / Aquaman, who arrives to save them from a deluge of water after Steppenwolf escapes.

After Curry joins the team, Wayne decides to use the Mother Box to resurrect Superman after examining its abilities, with Allen siding with him. Curry and Stone are sent to exhume Clark Kent's body, bonding over discussing the situation and their abilities. Upon returning to the lab, Allen charges up the Mother Box, which successfully revives Kent, though he has lost his memories and is triggered to attack the group. Allen tries to ambush Kent with his speed, but Kent counters with his own quickness and brute force, knocking Allen aside. Wayne has his butler Alfred Pennyworth bring Kent's girlfriend, Lois Lane, which calms him down.

Allen helps the team deduce that Steppenwolf will be in a nuclear fallout zone in Russia to try and unite all three Mother Boxes and reshape the Earth, so the team travels to confront him. While Wayne makes himself a distraction to the demon, Allen and the rest of the team flank Stone as he tries to pull the Mother Boxes apart. Upon seeing that civilians are in danger, Wayne orders Allen to evacuate them, but Kent arrives, singlehandedly saving the whole village while Allen saves a single family and helping the team to defeat Steppenwolf. Following the battle, Allen enthusiastically remains part of the team, now named the Justice League, and obtains an entry-level job with the Central City police department to his father's approval. Allen later challenges Kent to a race for fun.

Director's cut

During the battle under Gotham Harbor, Allen is more confident in his abilities. Prior to Kent's resurrection, Allen mistakes Stone's "no" for "go", charging up the Mother Box, and he is also shown crashing into Curry as the amnesiac Kent dodges an attack from him. Stone is also the one who discovers that Steppenwolf's base is in Russia, not Allen. During the final battle, Allen is assigned to provide an extra spark to help Stone pull apart the Mother Boxes. He fails the first time around as he is shot by a parademon while charging up his speed, allowing the "Unity" time to form, which kills the team and begins destroying the Earth. However, after regaining his confidence and healing himself, he manages to enter the Speed Force, running faster than the speed of light to reverse time and save his teammates from annihilation. He assists Stone in separating the boxes, allowing the team to defeat and kill Steppenwolf.

Following the battle, Allen enthusiastically remains part of the team and obtains an entry-level job with the Central City police department to his father's approval.

Life as a superhero 

In the intermittent years, Allen became one of the world's best known superheroes with his image and powers becoming ingrained into popular culture.

At some point, Allen encountered another version of himself (played by Grant Gustin) in the Speed Force. The two have a brief exchange, discovering they are the same person from different universes, and that the second Barry Allen has adopted the moniker of "The Flash". Oblivious to the crisis the Flash is facing, Allen fades out from the Speed Force. This encounter led to Allen's own eventual adoption of the superhero moniker "The Flash."

The vigilante Peacemaker claims to have met Allen, describing him as an 'unbearable d-bag'. Allen, alongside Prince, Kent and Curry, arrive to assist Peacemaker in fighting a group of parasitic aliens named The Butterflies, albeit too late, and are insulted by a frustrated and disdainful Peacemaker as a result.

Shortly after, Allen's prototype suit was destroyed following a skirmish with the supervillain Girder. Following a series of training sessions in order for Allen to reach his full potential, Bruce Wayne created a new suit for him using nanotechnology in order for it to be carried around in a ring.

Alternate versions

Knightmare reality 

In a dark potential future seen in visions by Bruce Wayne and Victor Stone, Darkseid has taken over the world after turning it into an apocalyptic wasteland and corrupted Superman into his second-in-command after killing Lois Lane. Flash, Batman, Cyborg, Mera, Deathstroke, and Joker are seen being hunted by the brainwashed Superman in one of these visions. Allen is shown to have travelled from this future reality back to 2015 to tell Wayne that Lane "is the key" and to "find the others" before disappearing, implying that he is trying to prevent Lane's death.

Earth Prime 

At some point, Allen encountered another version of himself (played by Grant Gustin) in the Speed Force. The two Allens have a brief exchange, discovering they are the same person from different universes, and that the second Allen has adopted the moniker of "The Flash". Oblivious to the crisis the Flash is facing, Allen fades out from the Speed Force. This encounter led to Allen's own eventual adoption of the superhero moniker "The Flash."

Flashpoint Reality 

Another version of Barry Allen (played again by Miller) is due to appear in the 2023 film The Flash. In this reality, Allen's mother was never murdered and he didn't go on to become the superhero The Flash.

In other media

Film

 In the DC Extended Universe film Shazam!, The Flash appears as a drawing in Freddie Freeman's scrapbook as well as various merchandise related to him.

Literature

 A three issue comic book tie-in miniseries, The Flash: The Fastest Man Alive, was released between September 2022 to November 2022, serving as a prelude to the 2023 film. The comic depicted Allen developing his skills and public presence as a superhero, coming face-to-face with a variety of villains including Girder, Tar Pit and Top. It also featured returning DCEU characters such as Batman as well as introductions to Patty Spivot, Albert and David Singh.

Video games

 The Flash's costume from Justice League appears as a skin in the 2018 video game Lego DC Supervillains.

Reception
Miller's performance in the theatrical cut of Justice League was praised as one of the film's highlights, despite the overall mixed-to-negative reviews for the film as a whole. In particular, Steve Persall of the Tampa Bay Times noted that "Ezra Miller's hyper-fast Flash is another sort of amusing, his fanboy spirit speaking for the audience while the CGI lightning trailing him is one of the movie's defining effects. The Flash's expression upon realizing he isn't the fastest person in the world is priceless, setting up the first of two end credits sequences." However, certain aspects of the character, such as an awkward-looking running motion and "forced" jokes as part of Joss Whedon's rewrites of the film, including the infamous "brunch" line and Flash falling on Wonder Woman's chest during the Gotham Harbor battle, were criticized.

Despite his lone major film role and numerous cameos at the time, the DCEU version of Flash was praised as a better-written character than his counterpart in the Arrowverse by Erik Kain of Forbes. Writing shortly after the premiere of Justice League, Kain writes that Ezra Miller's rendition of the character, despite being socially-awkward and having far less character development than Grant Gustin's version, is more likeable as a "quirky genius superhero" and is not tied down by "bad soap opera writing, propensity to lie all the time, and episode upon episode of filler" like his television counterpart.

Ezra Miller's performance and characterization in Zack Snyder's Justice League was also well-received with critics praising Barry Allen's increased confidence and chemistry with other characters, reduced "cringe-worthy" one liners, and his more integral role in the final battle, as compared to the theatrical cut. Tom Jergensen from IGN wrote: "He remains the comic relief character and fills that role well, as he's still a green enough hero to freak out when entering the Batcave for the first time. Snyder doubles down on Flash in the finale, with spectacular use of the Speed Force that raises the bar for his eventual solo film." The "Speed Force" scene from this cut of the film was later voted by fans as the winner of the "Oscars Cheer Moment" at the 94th Academy Awards.

Casting controversy

After a series of grooming allegations and disorderly conduct arrests, Miller's participation in  The Flash began to cause controversy with some fans campaigning that the role be recast. Reportedly, Grant Gustin trended often on the social media site Twitter as a replacement due to his work with the character in the television series.  It was reported by Deadline, that although Miller would play the role in the solo film - Warner Bros will not 'likely keep Miller in the Flash role in future DC films'.  However, in 2023 James Gunn commented on Miller reprising the role in the DC Universe franchise as being decided after their recovery from mental health issues.

See also
Flash in other media
Barry Allen (Arrowverse)
Characters of the DC Extended Universe

Notes

References

 The plot description and characterization were adapted from Flash and Justice League (film) at the DC Extended Universe Wiki, which are available under a Creative Commons Attribution-Share Alike 3.0 license.

External links

DC Comics American superheroes
Central City Police Department officers
Characters created by Zack Snyder
DC Comics characters with accelerated healing
DC Comics characters who can move at superhuman speeds
DC Comics metahumans
DC Comics male superheroes
DC Comics scientists
DC Extended Universe characters
Fictional American Jews
Fictional characters who can manipulate time
Fictional characters with electric or magnetic abilities
Fictional college students
Fictional forensic scientists
Fictional hackers
Film characters introduced in 2016
Flash (comics) characters
Flash (comics) in other media
Jewish superheroes
Male characters in film
Crossover characters in television
Casting controversies in film